Francesco Galuppini (born 17 October 1993) is an Italian footballer who plays as a forward for  club Novara on loan from Südtirol.

Club career
He made his Serie C debut for Lumezzane on 2 September 2012 in a game against Reggiana.

On 9 July 2019, he was sold by Parma to Renate.

On 20 January 2022, he signed a contract with Südtirol until 30 June 2024. On 21 July 2022, Galuppini was loaned to Novara.

References

External links
 

1993 births
Living people
Footballers from Brescia
Italian footballers
Association football forwards
Serie C players
Serie D players
F.C. Lumezzane V.G.Z. A.S.D. players
Real Vicenza V.S. players
FeralpiSalò players
Piacenza Calcio 1919 players
Parma Calcio 1913 players
Modena F.C. players
A.C. Cuneo 1905 players
Ravenna F.C. players
A.C. Renate players
F.C. Südtirol players
Novara F.C. players